Ogidi is a Yoruba town in Kogi State, Nigeria, known for its formations of igneous rock mountains, a traditional art industry, hospitality, valor and a deep tradition of self-reliance.

Location and history
Ogidi is situated on the southwestern tip of the old Northern Region. It is a three and a half hour drive from Abuja, Nigeria's capital.

It has deep historical ties with the northern and western part of Nigeria. The people of this town endured raids from and eventually  defeated the Nupe imperialists in late 19th century thus sealing their access to the western part of the country.  Administratively, it was under the Northern Region with Kaduna as the capital; then  Kwara State with Ilorin as the capital and now Kogi State with Lokoja as the capital. It shares boundaries with Kabba in Kabba/Bunnu LGA, and three towns in Ijumu LGA: Ayere, Iyara (the headquarters of Ijumu LGA) and Ogale.  Currently in Ijumu Local Government Area, It has just recently vacated the seat of the rotational Olujumu I, after the death of HRM. Oba J.O Sumanu. And Also the demise of Oba James Adeyemi Are Jegede the Ologidi of Ogidi Kogi State before the present ruling king which is the new Ologidi of Ogidi town Kogi State HRH. Oba Rafiu Oladimeji Sule.

Language and people
The language spoken in Ogidi is the Okun dialect of Yoruba. The men are traditionally farmers and hunters, and the women are renowned for arts, craft and trading.

Agriculture
The vegetation is a mix of forest and savannah. Coffee, cocoa, cassava, cashew, yam, maize, sweet potato, groundnut, palm kernel and kola are some of the popular produce from the town. Livestock–cattle, goats, sheep, poultry and their products–are also available in Ogidi.

Religion and tradition

Ogidians traditionally are stone worshippers; this may not be surprising, considering the abundance of igneous mountains and caves, and the reliance on them to ward off invaders. Ogidians defeated the Nupe imperialists who were Muslims; however, they accepted Islam later through peaceful means–trade and interaction. Christianity came much later with British colonialism. The town is traditionally ruled by an Oba like other communities in Ijumu Local Government on a rotational basis between the two ruling houses of Itaji and Okelare. The current king, Alhaji Rabiu Oladimeji Sule is from the Okelare ruling house in accordance with the tradition of the forebears, which is duly recognized by the government of the country. In line with this it is known that the next king in line would be from Itaji ruling house.

Notable residents
Chief  S. A. Ajayi a Nigerian Statesman and a minister of the first republic is from  Ogidi. Ogidi is the home town of Nike Davies Okundaye, the renowned batik artist. Sunday Bada, Olympic gold medalist, is from the town. Artist and musician, Twins Seven Seven, spent his early years there, as his mother was from the town. Abiodun Medupin, a farmer who has a large farm of palm kernel that produces red oil that has been exported to the United States of America. Olusola Medupin who own and runs Enish, a chain of about 6 Nigerian Cousins restaurants in UK and Dubai hail from Ogidi.

References

External links
Nigerian Field Society account with photographs 
Tourist account with photographs
Paintings by Twins Seven Seven

Populated places in Kogi State
Towns in Yorubaland